G.James Glass & Aluminium is an Australian industrial company, producing glass and aluminium products. G.James is a major Australian glass processor, aluminium window and door fabricator & contractor and production of extruded aluminium profiles.

Company history 
The origin of the G.James Group of Companies began in 1913 when an enterprising George James arrived in Australia after migrating from England. After working for various building related companies in Brisbane, George decided to use his skills as a glazier, along with his knowledge of sales and purchasing, to establish G.James Glass Merchants at West End (Brisbane) in 1917.

Initially the business was based on buying cases of glass and selling it cut-to-size to timber joiners in Queensland and New South Wales. Upon George's death in 1958 his son-in-law Joseph (Joe) Saragossi, together with his wife Pearle and sister-in-law Gertie Baratin, founded a private company in 1959.

In 2006, the company won an Australian Window Association (AWA) Design Award for the Best Use of Windows and Doors.

In June 2009, it lost a bid to supply glass for the Supreme and District Courts building in Brisbane. The winning bid was from a Chinese manufacturer.

References

External links
 G.James Glass & Aluminium website

Aluminium companies of Australia
Glassmaking companies
Manufacturing companies based in Brisbane
Australian brands